Children of the Arbat is a semi-autobiographical historical novel by Anatoly Rybakov set during the era of Stalin.

Premise
It recounts the era in the Soviet Union of the build-up to the Congress of the Victors, the early years of the second Five Year Plan and the (supposed) circumstances of the murder of Sergey Kirov prior to the beginning of the Great Purge. It is the first book of the trilogy, followed by the books 1935 and Other Years ((Book I of Fear) 1989), Fear and Dust and Ashes.

The novel
The story is mainly told that of the fictional Sasha Pankratov, a sincere and loyal Komsomol member who is exiled as a result of party intrigues. Rybakov too was exiled in the early 1930s. Hysteria grows as simple mistakes and humor are seen as examples of sabotage or acts of wreckers. (The Joke by Milan Kundera deals with similar topics). The book exposes how, despite the honest intentions of Pankratov and older Bolsheviks like Kirov, Stalinism is destroying all their hopes.

The novel is also notable for its portrayal of Joseph Stalin as a scheming and paranoid figure.

The book, which was written between 1966 and 1983, was suppressed until the Perestroika era (published for the first time as a feuilleton in 1987). It was a great publishing sensation of that era owing to its criticism of the Soviet system, its portrayal of Stalin and harsh in its cynical view of those who turned the Soviet Union into a "Great Power".

English translation
The English translation, by Harold Shukman, was first published in 1988 by Little, Brown & Company. It was later reprinted in paperback by Dell Publishing, a division of Bantam Doubleday Dell.

See also

Children of the Arbat - a 16-part television serial based on Rybakov's trilogy

References

External links
Sheppard, R.Z. & Jackson, James O. (June 6, 1988). "Red-Hot Children of the Arbat". Time. About the book's first Soviet editions.

Novels by Anatoly Rybakov
1987 novels
Novels about political repression in the Soviet Union
Works originally published in Russian newspapers
Novels set in the 1930s
Book censorship in the Soviet Union
Censored books